The Schwinger's quantum action principle is a variational approach to quantum mechanics and quantum field theory. This theory was introduced by Julian Schwinger in a series of articles starting 1950.

Approach 
In Schwingers approach, the action principle is targeted towards quantum mechanics. The action becomes a quantum action, i.e. an operator, . Although it is superficially different from the path integral formulation where the action is a classical function, the modern formulation of the two formalisms are identical.

Suppose we have two states defined by the values of a complete set of commuting operators at two times. Suppose that there is a parameter in the Lagrangian which can be varied, usually a source for a field. The main equation of Schwinger's quantum action principle is:

The infinitesimal change in the amplitude is clearly given by Schwinger's formula. Conversely, starting from Schwinger's formula, it is easy to show that the fields obey canonical commutation relations and the classical equations of motion, and so have a path integral representation. Schwinger's formulation was most significant because it could treat fermionic anticommuting fields with the same formalism as bose fields, thus implicitly introducing differentiation and integration with respect to anti-commuting coordinates.

References 

Perturbation theory
Quantum field theory
Principles